Stanley Hunter Ramsay (10 August 1904 – 19 July 1989) was a footballer and a member of the Norwich City Hall of Fame.

Ryton-born Ramsay made 82 appearances for Norwich as a left-half and left-back between 1932 and 1934, scoring once (see List of Norwich City F.C. club records).

Before playing for Norwich, Ramsay appeared for Blackpool and Sunderland. He captained Norwich to the club's first-ever honour, the championship of Division Three (South) in 1934. After Ramsay left Norwich, he became player-manager of Shrewsbury Town.

References
Specific

General

1904 births
1989 deaths
English footballers
Norwich City F.C. players
Blackpool F.C. players
Sunderland A.F.C. players
English football managers
Shrewsbury Town F.C. managers
People from Ryton, Tyne and Wear
Footballers from Tyne and Wear
Association football forwards
Association football midfielders